The 1980 Toronto Blue Jays season was the franchise's fourth season of Major League Baseball. It resulted in the Blue Jays finishing seventh in the American League East with a record of 67 wins and 95 losses. The season represented a turning point as Bobby Mattick became the second field manager in franchise history.

Offseason 
 October 22, 1979: Craig Kusick was released by the Blue Jays.
 November 1, 1979: Rick Cerone, Tom Underwood and Ted Wilborn were traded by the Blue Jays to the New York Yankees for Chris Chambliss, Dámaso García, and Paul Mirabella.
 December 5, 1979: Chris Chambliss and Luis Gómez were traded by the Blue Jays to the Atlanta Braves for Barry Bonnell, Pat Rockett, and Joey McLaughlin.
December 10, 1979: Andre Robertson was purchased by the New York Yankees from the Toronto Blue Jays.
 March 29, 1980: Rico Carty was released by the Blue Jays.
 March 29, 1980: Steve Luebber was released by the Blue Jays.

Regular season 
One of the highlights for the 1980 Blue Jays was the emergence of Dave Stieb as a quality starter.  Also, on May 4, Otto Vélez hit four home runs in a doubleheader sweep of the Cleveland Indians, including a walk-off shot in the first game.

Season standings

Record vs. opponents

Opening Day starters 
 Barry Bonnell
 Rick Bosetti
 Dámaso García
 Alfredo Griffin
 Roy Howell
 John Mayberry
 Dave Stieb
 Otto Vélez
 Ernie Whitt
 Alvis Woods

Roster

Game log 

|- align="center" bgcolor="ffbbbb"
| 1 || April 9 || @ Mariners || 8–6 || Parrott (1–0) || Lemanczyk (0–1) || Heaverlo (1) || 22,588 || 0–1
|- align="center" bgcolor="bbffbb"
| 2 || April 11 || @ Mariners || 10–7 (11) || Moore (1–0) || Dressler (0–1)  || || 6,104 || 1–1
|- align="center" bgcolor="ffbbbb"
| 3 || April 12 || @ Mariners || 3–2 (10) || Honeycutt (1–0) || Garvin (0–1)  || || 6,773 || 1–2
|- align="center" bgcolor="ffbbbb"
| 4 || April 13 || @ Mariners || 5–1 || Bannister (1–0) || Lemanczyk (0–2) || || 4,567 || 1–3
|- align="center" bgcolor="bbbbbb"
| – || April 14 || Brewers || colspan=6|Postponed (rain) Rescheduled for July 13
|- align="center" bgcolor="bbffbb"
| 5 || April 16 || Brewers || 11–2 || Stieb (1–0) || Slaton (0–1) || || 12,688 || 2–3
|- align="center" bgcolor="bbffbb"
| 6 || April 17 || Brewers || 1–0 || Mirabella (1–0) || Sorensen (1–1) || || 11,235 || 3–3
|- align="center" bgcolor="ffbbbb"
| 7 || April 19 || @ Indians || 8–1 || Waits (1–1) || Clancy (0–1) || || 61,753 || 3–4
|- align="center" bgcolor="bbffbb"
| 8 || April 20 || @ Indians || 5–3 || Lemanczyk (1–2) || Denny (0–2) || McLaughlin (1) || 11,220 || 4–4
|- align="center" bgcolor="bbffbb"
| 9 || April 21 || @ Royals || 7–1 || Stieb (2–0) || Gale (0–2) || || 21,117 || 5–4
|- align="center" bgcolor="ffbbbb"
| 10 || April 22 || @ Royals || 7–2 || Splittorff (2–0) || Mirabella (1–1) || || 16,993 || 5–5
|- align="center" bgcolor="ffbbbb"
| 11 || April 23 || @ Royals || 7–4 || Christenson (1–0) || McLaughlin (0–1) || Quisenberry (2) || 18,855 || 5–6
|- align="center" bgcolor="bbffbb"
| 12 || April 25 || @ Brewers || 5–3 || McLaughlin (1–1) || Sorensen (1–2) || || 9,902 || 6–6
|- align="center" bgcolor="bbffbb"
| 13 || April 26 || @ Brewers || 4–0 || Stieb (3–0) || Caldwell (2–1) || || 11,038 || 7–6
|- align="center" bgcolor="bbffbb"
| 14 || April 27 || @ Brewers || 8–2 || Mirabella (2–1) || Haas (1–3) || Moore (1) || 11,099 || 8–6
|- align="center" bgcolor="bbbbbb"
| – || April 28 || Royals || colspan=6|Postponed (rain) Rescheduled for August 8
|- align="center" bgcolor="bbffbb"
| 15 || April 29 || Royals || 3–1 || Clancy (1–1) || Leonard (0–3) || || 11,553 || 9–6
|- align="center" bgcolor="ffbbbb"
| 16 || April 30 || Royals || 3–0 || Gura (3–1) || Jefferson (0–1) || || 14,029 || 9–7
|-

|- align="center" bgcolor="ffbbbb"
| 17 || May 1 || Indians || 2–1 || Denny (1–2) || Lemanczyk (1–3) || Monge (2) || 11,654 || 9–8
|- align="center" bgcolor="ffbbbb"
| 18 || May 2 || Indians || 6–1 || Barker (3–1) || Stieb (3–1) || || 14,292 || 9–9
|- align="center" bgcolor="bbffbb"
| 19 || May 3 || Indians || 8–3 || Buskey (1–0) || Waits (1–3) || || 16,564 || 10–9
|- align="center" bgcolor="bbffbb"
| 20 || May 4 || Indians || 9–8 (10) || Buskey (2–0) || Monge (0–1) || || || 11–9
|- align="center" bgcolor="bbffbb"
| 21 || May 4 || Indians || 7–2 || Jefferson (1–1) || Owchinko (0–3) || McLaughlin (2) || 26,114 || 12–9
|- align="center" bgcolor="bbffbb"
| 22 || May 6 || @ Angels || 3–2 || Lemanczyk (2–3) || Aase (3–2) || Garvin (1) || 23,804 || 13–9
|- align="center" bgcolor="bbffbb"
| 23 || May 7 || @ Angels || 7–3 || Stieb (4–1) || Knapp (0–2) || || 21,733 || 14–9
|- align="center" bgcolor="bbffbb"
| 24 || May 8 || @ Angels || 9–2 || Mirabella (3–1) || Frost (3–3) || || 23,006 || 15–9
|- align="center" bgcolor="bbbbbb"
| – || May 9 || @ Athletics || colspan=6|Postponed (rain) Rescheduled for July 22
|- align="center" bgcolor="ffbbbb"
| 25 || May 10 || @ Athletics || 4–3 || Langford (3–1) || Garvin (0–2) || || 4,925 || 15–10
|- align="center" bgcolor="ffbbbb"
| 26 || May 11 || @ Athletics || 12–1 || Norris (5–0) || Lemanczyk (2–4) || || 7,843 || 15–11
|- align="center" bgcolor="bbbbbb"
| – || May 13 || Mariners || colspan=6|Postponed (rain) Rescheduled for July 26
|- align="center" bgcolor="ffbbbb"
| 27 || May 14 || Mariners || 7–0 || Abbott (3–2) || Mirabella (3–2) || || 13,055 || 15–12
|- align="center" bgcolor="bbffbb"
| 28 || May 15 || Mariners || 1–0 || Clancy (2–1) || Bannister (2–3) || || 11,579 || 16–12
|- align="center" bgcolor="bbffbb"
| 29 || May 16 || Athletics || 1–0 (11)|| Jefferson (2–1) || Norris (5–1) || || 16,138 || 17–12
|- align="center" bgcolor="ffbbbb"
| 30 || May 17 || Athletics || 4–2 (14)|| Keough (5–3) || McLaughlin (1–2) || || 23,074 || 17–13
|- align="center" bgcolor="bbffbb"
| 31 || May 18 || Athletics || 12–1 || Mirabella (4–2) || Langford (3–2) || || 14,414 || 18–13
|- align="center" bgcolor="bbffbb"
| 32 || May 19 || Red Sox || 7–2 || Clancy (3–1) || Billingham (1–1) || || 32,731 || 19–13
|- align="center" bgcolor="ffbbbb"
| 33 || May 20 || Red Sox || 4–3 || Rainey (4–0) || Lemanczyk (2–5) || Burgmeier (7) || 18,167 || 19–14
|- align="center" bgcolor="ffbbbb"
| 34 || May 21 || Red Sox || 11–2 || Torrez (1–4) || Jefferson (2–2) || || 19,556 || 19–15
|- align="center" bgcolor="ffbbbb"
| 35 || May 22 || Yankees || 5–1 || Griffin (1–2) || Stieb (4–2) || || 26,047 || 19–16
|- align="center" bgcolor="ffbbbb"
| 36 || May 23 || Yankees || 7–3 || Guidry (5–0) || Mirabella (4–3) || || 24,585 || 19–17
|- align="center" bgcolor="ffbbbb"
| 37 || May 24 || Yankees || 6–2 || Tiant (3–2) || Clancy (3–2) || May (3) || 31,021 || 19–18
|- align="center" bgcolor="bbffbb"
| 38 || May 25 || Yankees || 9–6 || Leal (1–0) || John (7–2) || || 33,077 || 20–18
|- align="center" bgcolor="bbffbb"
| 39 || May 26 || @ Red Sox || 3–1 || Garvin (1–2) || Drago (2–2) || || 18,853 || 21–18
|- align="center" bgcolor="ffbbbb"
| 40 || May 27 || @ Red Sox || 5–4 || Renko (3–0) || Buskey (2–1) || || 16,679 || 21–19
|- align="center" bgcolor="bbffbb"
| 41 || May 28 || @ Red Sox || 4–1 || Stieb (5–2) || Stanley (3–5) || McLaughlin (3) || 18,215 || 22–19
|- align="center" bgcolor="ffbbbb"
| 42 || May 30 || @ Yankees || 6–0 || Tiant (4–2) || Clancy (3–3) || Gossage (5) || 24,319 || 22–20
|- align="center" bgcolor="ffbbbb"
| 43 || May 31 || @ Yankees || 8–6 (11)|| May (3–1) || McLaughlin (1–3) || || 25,158 || 22–21
|-

|- align="center" bgcolor="ffbbbb"
| 44 || June 1 || @ Yankees || 11–7 || Underwood (5–3) || Mirabella (4–4) || || 52,049 || 22–22
|- align="center" bgcolor="ffbbbb"
| 45 || June 2 || Angels || 6–3 || Frost (4–3) || Leal (1–1) || LaRoche (3) || 15,079 || 22–23
|- align="center" bgcolor="bbffbb"
| 46 || June 3 || Angels || 7–6 (11)|| McLaughlin (2–3) || LaRoche (1–2) || || 15,589 || 23–23
|- align="center" bgcolor="bbffbb"
| 47 || June 4 || Angels || 8–2 || Clancy (4–3) || Martínez (1–1) || || 16,677 || 24–23
|- align="center" bgcolor="bbbbbb"
| – || June 5 || @ Twins || colspan=6|Postponed (rain) Rescheduled for June 8
|- align="center" bgcolor="ffbbbb"
| 48 || June 6 || @ Twins || 5–0 || Zahn (4–7) || Mirabella (4–5) || || 5,495 || 24–24
|- align="center" bgcolor="ffbbbb"
| 49 || June 7 || @ Twins || 3–2 || Jackson (2–3) || Stieb (5–3) || Corbett (5) || 5,375 || 24–25
|- align="center" bgcolor="ffbbbb"
| 50 || June 8 || @ Twins || 5–1 || Erickson (1–3) || Jefferson (2–3) || Corbett (6) || || 24–26
|- align="center" bgcolor="bbffbb"
| 51 || June 8 || @ Twins || 6–4 (13)|| McLaughlin (3–3) || Arroyo (0–1) || || 17,869 || 25–26
|- align="center" bgcolor="bbffbb"
| 52 || June 10 || @ White Sox || 1–0 || Clancy (5–3) || Baumgarten (1–3) || || 18,225 || 26–26
|- align="center" bgcolor="ffbbbb"
| 53 || June 11 || @ White Sox || 7–4 || Kravec (3–4) || Mirabella (4–6) || Farmer (14) || 17,537 || 26–27
|- align="center" bgcolor="ffbbbb"
| 54 || June 13 || Rangers || 6–3 || Medich (6–3) || Stieb (5–4) || Lyle (6) || 20,034 || 26–28
|- align="center" bgcolor="bbffbb"
| 55 || June 14 || Rangers || 7–6 || Buskey (3–1) || Babcock (0–2) || || 24,184 || 27–28
|- align="center" bgcolor="bbffbb"
| 56 || June 15 || Rangers || 5–3 || Clancy (6–3) || Jenkins (4–5) || Garvin (2) || 30,143 || 28–28
|- align="center" bgcolor="ffbbbb"
| 57 || June 16 || Twins || 4–0 || Zahn (5–9) || Jefferson (2–4) || || 14,691 || 28–29
|- align="center" bgcolor="ffbbbb"
| 58 || June 17 || Twins || 8–6 || Corbett (4–2) || Mirabella (4–7) || || 15,229 || 28–30
|- align="center" bgcolor="bbffbb"
| 59 || June 18 || White Sox || 5–4 || Stieb (6–4) || Trout (2–7) || || || 29–30
|- align="center" bgcolor="bbffbb"
| 60 || June 18 || White Sox || 3–1 || Kucek (1–0) || Dotson (6–3) || McLaughlin (4) || 21,443 || 30–30
|- align="center" bgcolor="bbbbbb"
| – || June 19 || White Sox || colspan=6|Postponed (rain) Rescheduled for September 7
|- align="center" bgcolor="ffbbbb"
| 61 || June 20 || @ Rangers || 5–2 || Jenkins (5–5) || Garvin (1–3) || || 13,747 || 30–31
|- align="center" bgcolor="ffbbbb"
| 62 || June 21 || @ Rangers || 2–1 || Matlack (4–3) || McLaughlin (3–4) || || 17,846 || 30–32
|- align="center" bgcolor="bbffbb"
| 63 || June 22 || @ Rangers || 6–5 (10)|| Garvin (2–3) || Kern (2–9) || || 13,650 || 31–32
|- align="center" bgcolor="ffbbbb"
| 64 || June 24 || @ Orioles || 1–0 || McGregor (7–3) || Stieb (6–5) || || 14,884 || 31–33
|- align="center" bgcolor="ffbbbb"
| 65 || June 25 || @ Orioles || 6–3 || Palmer (7–4) || Leal (1–2) || || 14,588 || 31–34
|- align="center" bgcolor="ffbbbb"
| 66 || June 26 || @ Orioles || 4–1 || Stone (10–3) || Clancy (6–4) || || 13,023 || 31–35
|- align="center" bgcolor="ffbbbb"
| 67 || June 27 || Tigers || 7–2 || Morris (9–6) || Jefferson (2–5) || || 18,494 || 31–36
|- align="center" bgcolor="ffbbbb"
| 68 || June 28 || Tigers || 8–3 || Rozema (4–4) || Kucek (1–1) || || 20,059 || 31–37
|- align="center" bgcolor="bbffbb"
| 69 || June 29 || Tigers || 2–0 || Stieb (7–5) || Petry (4–4) || || 22,026 || 32–37
|- align="center" bgcolor="ffbbbb"
| 70 || June 30 || Orioles || 9–7 || Stone (11–3) || Leal (1–3) || || 18,399 || 32–38
|-

|- align="center" bgcolor="ffbbbb"
| 71 || July 1 || Orioles || 2–0 || Palmer (8–4) || Clancy (6–5) || Martinez (4) || 23,475 || 32–39
|- align="center" bgcolor="ffbbbb"
| 72 || July 2 || Orioles || 6–2 || Flanagan (8–6) || Mirabella (4–8) || || 18,461 || 32–40
|- align="center" bgcolor="ffbbbb"
| 73 || July 3 || @ Tigers || 8–5 || Underwood (2–5) || McLaughlin (3–5) || || 30,027 || 32–41
|- align="center" bgcolor="ffbbbb"
| 74 || July 4 || @ Tigers || 4–3 || Petry (5–4) || Stieb (7–6) || López (11) || 29,370 || 32–42
|- align="center" bgcolor="bbffbb"
| 75 || July 5 || @ Tigers || 5–3 || Clancy (7–5) || Wilcox (8–5) || Garvin (3) || 32,925 || 33–42
|- align="center" bgcolor="ffbbbb"
| 76 || July 6 || @ Tigers || 7–5 || Morris (11–6) || Garvin (2–4) || López (12) || 28,564 || 33–43
|- align="center" bgcolor="ffbbbb"
| 77 || July 10 || Indians || 7–3 || Denny (8–5) || Clancy (7–6) || || 17,178 || 33–44
|- align="center" bgcolor="bbffbb"
| 78 || July 11 || Indians || 6–3 || Stieb (8–6) || Garland (3–2) || || 16,621 || 34–44
|- align="center" bgcolor="ffbbbb"
| 79 || July 12 || Brewers || 9–2 || Travers (9–3) || Moore (1–1) || || 23,624 || 34–45
|- align="center" bgcolor="bbffbb"
| 80 || July 13 || Brewers || 4–1 || Kucek (2–1) || Haas (9–8) || Garvin (4) || || 35–45
|- align="center" bgcolor="ffbbbb"
| 81 || July 13 || Brewers || 4–0 || Mitchell (1–0) || McLaughlin (3–6) || || 26,331 || 35–46
|- align="center" bgcolor="ffbbbb"
| 82 || July 14 || Brewers || 6–4 || Augustine (2–2) || Clancy (7–7) || Castro (6) || 19,443 || 35–47
|- align="center" bgcolor="bbffbb"
| 83 || July 16 || @ Mariners || 5–0 || Stieb (9–6) || Abbott (7–5) || || 5,644 || 36–47
|- align="center" bgcolor="ffbbbb"
| 84 || July 17 || @ Mariners || 5–3 || Rawley (5–3) || Jefferson (2–6) || || 5,726 || 36–48
|- align="center" bgcolor="ffbbbb"
| 85 || July 18 || @ Angels || 6–3 || Halicki (3–1) || Kucek (2–2) || Clear (7) || 23,866 || 36–49
|- align="center" bgcolor="bbffbb"
| 86 || July 19 || @ Angels || 5–4 || Clancy (8–7) || Montague (2–2) || || 35,221 || 37–49
|- align="center" bgcolor="bbffbb"
| 87 || July 20 || @ Angels || 6–3 (10)|| McLaughlin (4–6) || Clear (6–6) || || 23,903 || 38–49
|- align="center" bgcolor="bbffbb"
| 88 || July 21 || @ Athletics || 1–0 || Stieb (10–6) || Kingman (5–10) || || 14,588 || 39–49
|- align="center" bgcolor="bbffbb"
| 89 || July 22 || @ Athletics || 6–2 || Jefferson (3–6) || Keough (10–10) || Garvin (5) || || 40–49
|- align="center" bgcolor="ffbbbb"
| 90 || July 22 || @ Athletics || 5–1 || Norris (13–6) || Mirabella (4–9) || || 8,645 || 40–50
|- align="center" bgcolor="ffbbbb"
| 91 || July 23 || @ Athletics || 6–2 || McCatty (8–9) || Kucek (2–3) || || 4,765 || 40–51
|- align="center" bgcolor="bbffbb"
| 92 || July 25 || Mariners || 5–3 || Clancy (9–7) || Honeycutt (8–9) || || 16,248 || 41–51
|- align="center" bgcolor="ffbbbb"
| 93 || July 26 || Mariners || 7–2 || Dressler (1–4) || Stieb (10–7) || || || 41–52
|- align="center" bgcolor="bbffbb"
| 94 || July 26 || Mariners || 7–5 || Kucek (3–3) || Abbott (8–6) || Garvin (6) || 18,067 || 42–52
|- align="center" bgcolor="bbffbb"
| 95 || July 27 || Mariners || 5–0 || Jefferson (4–6) || Bannister (6–9) || || 17,080 || 43–52
|- align="center" bgcolor="ffbbbb"
| 96 || July 28 || Athletics || 5 – 3 (8)|| Norris (14–6) || Barlow (0–1) || || 14,457 || 43–53
|- align="center" bgcolor="ffbbbb"
| 97 || July 29 || Athletics || 6–5 (12)|| Lacey (2–1) || Garvin (2–5) || || 16,704 || 43–54
|- align="center" bgcolor="ffbbbb"
| 98 || July 30 || Athletics || 11–1 || Langford (10–9) || Stieb (10–8) || || 17,654 || 43–55
|-

|- align="center" bgcolor="bbffbb"
| 99 || August 1 || Angels || 9–8 || Garvin (3–5) || Clear (7–9) || || 16,145 || 44–55
|- align="center" bgcolor="ffbbbb"
| 100 || August 2 || Angels || 5–4 || LaRoche (2–2) || Jefferson (4–7) || || 22,051 || 44–56
|- align="center" bgcolor="bbffbb"
| 101 || August 3 || Angels || 3–1 || Clancy (10–7) || Martinez (2–4) || Barlow (1) || 20,404 || 45–56
|- align="center" bgcolor="ffbbbb"
| 102 || August 4 || @ Indians || 11–5 || Spillner (9–8) || Mirabella (4–10) || Monge (9) || 7,583 || 45–57
|- align="center" bgcolor="ffbbbb"
| 103 || August 5 || @ Indians || 8–5 || Grimsley (3–0) || Kucek (3–4) || Cruz (6) || 6,707 || 45–58
|- align="center" bgcolor="ffbbbb"
| 104 || August 6 || @ Indians || 5–2 || Waits (8–10) || Jefferson (4–8) || Cruz (7) || 9,098 || 45–59
|- align="center" bgcolor="ffbbbb"
| 105 || August 7 || @ Indians || 7–6 || Monge (1–4) || Garvin (3–6) || || 9,586 || 45–60
|- align="center" bgcolor="ffbbbb"
| 106 || August 8 || Royals || 9–0 || Gale (10–7) || Clancy (10–8) || || || 45–61
|- align="center" bgcolor="ffbbbb"
| 107 || August 8 || Royals || 7–4 || Pattin (3–0) || Garvin (3–7) || || 22,146 || 45–62
|- align="center" bgcolor="bbffbb"
| 108 || August 9 || Royals || 4–3 (14)|| Willis (1–0) || Eastwick (0–1) || || 21,300 || 46–62
|- align="center" bgcolor="ffbbbb"
| 109 || August 10 || Royals || 8–5 || Leonard (13–8) || Jefferson (4–9) || Pattin (4) || 23,473 || 46–63
|- align="center" bgcolor="bbffbb"
| 110 || August 12 || @ Brewers || 3–1 || Clancy (11–8) || Sorensen (8–8) || || || 47–63
|- align="center" bgcolor="bbffbb"
| 111 || August 12 || @ Brewers || 5–4 || Barlow (1–1) || Castro (0–4) || Garvin (7) || 18,820 || 48–63
|- align="center" bgcolor="ffbbbb"
| 112 || August 13 || @ Brewers || 5–4 || Travers (11–5) || McLaughlin (4–7) || || 14,304 || 48–64
|- align="center" bgcolor="ffbbbb"
| 113 || August 14 || @ Brewers || 4–2 || Haas (14–9) || Stieb (10–9) || || 21,115 || 48–65
|- align="center" bgcolor="ffbbbb"
| 114 || August 15 || @ Royals || 4–3 || Leonard (14–8) || Jefferson (4–10) || Quisenberry (24) || 34,861 || 48–66
|- align="center" bgcolor="ffbbbb"
| 115 || August 16 || @ Royals || 11–5 || Gura (17–5) || Kucek (3–5) || || 39,631 || 48–67
|- align="center" bgcolor="ffbbbb"
| 116 || August 17 || @ Royals || 8–3 || Splittorff (9–8) || Clancy (11–9) || Quisenberry (25) || 30,693 || 48–68
|- align="center" bgcolor="bbffbb"
| 117 || August 19 || @ Twins || 4–3 || Barlow (2–1) || Corbett (8–5) || Schrom (1) || 6,902 || 49–68
|- align="center" bgcolor="bbffbb"
| 118 || August 20 || @ Twins || 10–4 || Todd (1–0) || Zahn (10–16) || || 4,198 || 50–68
|- align="center" bgcolor="ffbbbb"
| 119 || August 21 || @ White Sox || 5–3 || Hoyt (5–2) || Jefferson (4–11) || Farmer (21) || 15,303 || 50–69
|- align="center" bgcolor="ffbbbb"
| 120 || August 22 || @ White Sox || 2–0 || Burns (11–12) || Clancy (11–10) || Farmer (22) || 15,033 || 50–70
|- align="center" bgcolor="ffbbbb"
| 121 || August 23 || @ White Sox || 5–1 || Dotson (10–8) || Kucek (3–6) || || 10,768 || 50–71
|- align="center" bgcolor="bbffbb"
| 122 || August 24 || @ White Sox || 7–3 || Stieb (11–9) || Baumgarten (2–8) || Barlow (2) || 17,156 || 51–71
|- align="center" bgcolor="ffbbbb"
| 123 || August 25 || Rangers || 5–1 || Clay (2–0) || Todd (1–1) || Johnson (2) || 15,517 || 51–72
|- align="center" bgcolor="ffbbbb"
| 124 || August 26 || Rangers || 8–0 || Hough (2–1) || Jefferson (4–12) || || 15,478 || 51–73
|- align="center" bgcolor="bbffbb"
| 125 || August 27 || Rangers || 6–4 || Clancy (12–10) || Medich (10–9) || Garvin (8) || 15,442 || 52–73
|- align="center" bgcolor="ffbbbb"
| 126 || August 28 || Twins || 7–5 (15) † || Verhoeven (2–3) || Jefferson (4–13) || Williams (1) || 14,035 || 52–74
|- align="center" bgcolor="ffbbbb"
| 127 || August 29 || Twins || 5–2 || Zahn (11–17) || Stieb (11–10) || || 14,358 || 52–75
|- align="center" bgcolor="bbffbb"
| 128 || August 30 || Twins || 3–2 || Todd (2–1) || Verhoeven (2–4) || || 18,376 || 53–75
|- align="center" bgcolor="bbffbb"
| 129 || August 31 || Twins || 7–1 || Clancy (13–10) || Koosman (11–12) || || 18,029 || 54–75
|-

|- align="center" bgcolor="ffbbbb"
| 130 || September 1 || @ Rangers || 9–1 || Medich (11–9) || McLaughlin (4–8) || || 8,224 || 54–76
|- align="center" bgcolor="ffbbbb"
| 131 || September 2 || @ Rangers || 3–2 || Jenkins (12–10) || Leal (1–4) || || 6,903 || 54–77
|- align="center" bgcolor="bbffbb"
| 132 || September 3 || @ Rangers || 4–2 || Stieb (12–10) || Figueroa (3–9) || || 6,984 || 55–77
|- align="center" bgcolor="bbffbb"
| 133 || September 4 || White Sox || 3–2 || Todd (3–1) || Farmer (6–8) || || 12,365 || 56–77
|- align="center" bgcolor="ffbbbb"
| 134 || September 5 || White Sox || 3–0 || Hoyt (7–2) || Clancy (13–11) || || 14,091 || 56–78
|- align="center" bgcolor="bbffbb"
| 135 || September 7 || White Sox || 3–1 || McLaughlin (5–8) || Trout (8–13) || Barlow (3) || || 57–78
|- align="center" bgcolor="bbffbb"
| 136 || September 7 || White Sox || 7–6 || Schrom (1–0) || Proly (3–9) || Barlow (4) || 17,457 || 58–78
|- align="center" bgcolor="ffbbbb"
| 137 || September 8 || Yankees || 7–4 || John (20–7) || Stieb (12–11) || Gossage (25) || 23,020 || 58–79
|- align="center" bgcolor="bbffbb"
| 138 || September 9 || Yankees || 6–4 || Todd (4–1) || Perry (9–11) || Willis (1) || 22,471 || 59–79
|- align="center" bgcolor="ffbbbb"
| 139 || September 10 || Yankees || 7–6 || Davis (6–3) || Clancy (13–12) || Gossage (26) || 23,031 || 59–80
|- align="center" bgcolor="ffbbbb"
| 140 || September 11 || Orioles || 6–1 || Stone (23–6) || Mirabella (4–11) || || 14,025 || 59–81
|- align="center" bgcolor="bbffbb"
| 141 || September 12 || Orioles || 7–5 || McLaughlin (6–8) || Flanagan (14–12) || Willis (2) || 15,632 || 60–81
|- align="center" bgcolor="ffbbbb"
| 142 || September 13 || Orioles || 6–4 || McGregor (18–7) || Stieb (12–12) || Stoddard (22) || 18,043 || 60–82
|- align="center" bgcolor="bbffbb"
| 143 || September 14 || Orioles || 4–3 (13)|| Barlow (3–1) || Martínez (5–4) || || 19,117 || 61–82
|- align="center" bgcolor="ffbbbb"
| 144 || September 16 || @ Yankees || 5–4 || Guidry (14–10) || Clancy (13–13) || Gossage (28) || 20,281 || 61–83
|- align="center" bgcolor="ffbbbb"
| 145 || September 17 || @ Yankees || 8–7 (13) ‡ || Underwood (13–9) || Kucek (3–7) || || 22,516 || 61–84
|- align="center" bgcolor="bbffbb"
| 146 || September 18 || @ Yankees || 2–1 || Leal (2–4) || John (21–8) || || 20,129 || 62–84
|- align="center" bgcolor="ffbbbb"
| 147 || September 19 || @ Orioles || 8–6 (12)|| Martinez (3–3) || Willis (1–1) || || 12,706 || 62–85
|- align="center" bgcolor="ffbbbb"
| 148 || September 20 || @ Orioles || 6–1 || Stone (24–7) || Stieb (12–13) || || 16,269 || 62–86
|- align="center" bgcolor="ffbbbb"
| 149 || September 21 || @ Orioles || 2–1 || Flanagan (15–12) || Clancy (13–14) || Stoddard (24) || 14,251 || 62–87
|- align="center" bgcolor="bbffbb"
| 150 || September 22 || @ Tigers || 6–5 || Garvin (4–7) || Weaver (2–3) || Willis (3) || 6,210 || 63–87
|- align="center" bgcolor="bbffbb"
| 151 || September 23 || @ Tigers || 9–7 || Willis (2–1) || Rozema (6–9) || Kucek (1) || 6,363 || 64–87
|- align="center" bgcolor="ffbbbb"
| 152 || September 24 || @ Tigers || 9–8 (10)|| Petry (10–9) || Kucek (3–8) || || 7,129 || 64–88
|- align="center" bgcolor="ffbbbb"
| 153 || September 26 || Red Sox || 3–1 || Eckersley (12–13) || Stieb (12–14) || || 15,187 || 64–89
|- align="center" bgcolor="ffbbbb"
| 154 || September 27 || Red Sox || 4–3 || Stanley (10–7) || Clancy (13–15) || Burgmeier (24) || 21,533 || 64–90
|- align="center" bgcolor="ffbbbb"
| 155 || September 28 || Red Sox || 7–3 || Crawford (2–0) || McLaughlin (6–9) || || 32,042 || 64–91
|- align="center" bgcolor="ffbbbb"
| 156 || September 29 || Tigers || 8–2 || Weaver (3–3) || Mirabella (4–12) || López (21) || 12,051 || 64–92
|- align="center" bgcolor="ffbbbb"
| 157 || September 30 || Tigers || 5–3 || Schatzeder (11–12) || Todd (4–2) || || 12,119 || 64–93
|-

|- align="center" bgcolor="ffbbbb"
| 158 || October 1 || Tigers || 11–7 || Fidrych (2–3) || Stieb (12–15) || Underwood (5) || 12,426 || 64–94
|- align="center" bgcolor="ffbbbb"
| 159 || October 2 || @ Red Sox || 4–1 || Tudor (8–5) || Clancy (13–16) || || 11,872 || 64–95
|- align="center" bgcolor="bbbbbb"
| – || October 3 || @ Red Sox || colspan=6|Postponed (rain) Rescheduled for October 4
|- align="center" bgcolor="bbffbb"
| 160 || October 4 || @ Red Sox || 7–6 (17)|| Leal (3–4) || Stanley (10–8) || Barlow (5) || || 65–95
|- align="center" bgcolor="bbffbb"
| 161 || October 4 || @ Red Sox || 3–1 || Mirabella (5–12) || Drago (7–7) || || 14,179 || 66–95
|- align="center" bgcolor="bbffbb"
| 162 || October 5 || @ Red Sox || 4–1 || Todd (5–2) || MacWhorter (0–3) || || 16,562 || 67–95
|-

| † Game suspended due to curfew after the 14th inning.  Completed on August 29.‡ Game suspended due to rain in the top of the 10th inning.  Completed on September 18.

Player stats

Batting

Starters by position 
Note: Pos = Position; G = Games played; AB = At bats; R = Runs scored; H = Hits; 2B = Doubles; 3B = Triples; Avg. = Batting average; HR = Home runs; RBI = Runs batted in; SB = Stolen bases

Other batters 
Note: G = Games played; AB = At bats; R = Runs scored; H = Hits; 2B = Doubles; 3B = Triples; Avg. = Batting average; HR = Home runs; RBI = Runs batted in; SB = Stolen bases

Pitching

Starting pitchers 
Note: G = Games pitched; GS = Games started; IP = Innings pitched; W = Wins; L = Losses; ERA = Earned run average; R = Runs allowed; ER = Earned runs allowed; BB = Walks allowed; K = Strikeouts

Other pitchers 
Note: G = Games pitched; GS = Games started; IP = Innings pitched; W = Wins; L = Losses; SV = Saves; ERA = Earned run average; R = Runs allowed; ER = Earned runs allowed; BB = Walks allowed; K = Strikeouts

Relief pitchers 
Note: G = Games pitched; IP = Innings pitched; W = Wins; L = Losses; SV = Saves; ERA = Earned run average; R = Runs allowed; ER = Earned runs allowed; BB = Walks allowed; K = Strikeouts

Awards and honors 
 Dave Stieb, Pitcher of the Month Award, April

All-Star Game
 Dave Stieb

Farm system

Notes

External links 
1980 Toronto Blue Jays at Baseball Reference
1980 Toronto Blue Jays at Baseball Almanac
Box Score and Play by Play of Tor vs. Cle, May 4, 1980, Game 1

Toronto Blue Jays seasons
Toronto Blue Jays season
1980 in Canadian sports
1980 in Toronto